Pindiga is the capital of the Pindiga Emirate located in Akko Local government area of Gombe state, Nigeria . Pindiga is a house with a fascinating history that was built by Jukun between the 16th and 17th century. The village began with a small group of people living on a rock and has now grown to become the fifth largest Emirates in Gombe State.

History 
Pindiga is a historic town in Akko Local Government Area, Gombe State the Jukun people from Yemen began to settle in the region of the back people in the 16th and 17th century.

The emir "Sarki" of Gombe Buba Yaro began waging war against them in the village of Binga in the year 1815 A.D., but despite all of his efforts, he was unable to overcome them until the end of his life.

The fight continues in this manner until the period of Gombe's emir, Umarun Kwairanga. The soldiers who combat the Jukun in the Binga region form a serious assembly of soldiers from Bauchi, Misau, Jama'are, and other places. Unless those who flee in the hope of saving their lives, the style of battle waged against them is called as operation kill all.

The few who fled subsequently returned and settled on a rock they named "Kartum." They opted to name their new colony after the name given to them as a result of their previous settlement in Khartoum, which is now in Sudan.

After a long amount of time on the rock, they decide to migrate to a location that is less than one and a half kilometers from their previous location and dwell on another rock known as puli, which is now known as Jukun rock and is located behind Pindiga.

After colonial overlords defeated Gombe in a fight in 1903, they dropped Jukuns from the cliffs and settled in Pindiga.

Festival 
Pindiga which is one of the towns and Villages in Akko Local Government area has two peculiar festivals; Eku and Tangra festival

Schools 
Primary schools located in pindiga town include Central primary school, Udan-boma primary school and Gwagol primary school

The only  federal University found in the town is the Federal University Kashere (FUK), Gombe state. It is centered on pursuits and acquisition of knowledge  as well as commitment to service of learning, The Motto of FUK is 'Education for Global Citizenship'.

References 

History of Nigeria
History of Nigeria by state
History of Nigeria by period